Shahnaz Laghari is the first Pakistani Hijabi female pilot who flew aircraft wearing the hijab. She is also a good social worker in her community, and running few training centers to empower the women in the society.

Political career
She began her political career as an independent leader and first contested in the General Elections-2013 from Lahore but could not succeed. According to the local media of Lahore Shahnaz joined Pakistan Muslim League-Quaid (PMLQ) political party in May 2018.

References

Living people
Year of birth missing (living people)
Pakistani aviators
People from Lahore